The SLAMRAAM (Surface Launched AMRAAM) was the US Army program to develop a Humvee-based surface-to-air missile launcher for the AIM-120 AMRAAM missile, manufactured by Raytheon Technologies and  Kongsberg Defence & Aerospace. Surface-launched AMRAAM missile was first used in Kongsberg's NASAMS air defense system, fielded in 1995.

Although the US Army canceled the SLAMRAAM program in 2011, the mobile launcher became part of NASAMS configuration options in 2019.

History
The Norwegian Advanced Surface-to-Air Missile System (NASAMS), developed by Kongsberg Defence & Aerospace, consists of a number of vehicle-pulled batteries (containing six AMRAAMs launch containers each) along with separate radar trucks and control station vehicles.

The US Marine Corps conducted trial of surface-launched AMRAAM missiles during 1997, demonstrating intercept ranges of over 15 km. In April 2001, the Marines awarded Raytheon a contract for the development of the Complementary Low-Altitude Weapon System (CLAWS), with Kongsberg Defence & Aerospace as a subcontractor and Boeing as the developer of fire and control shelter. In 2006, the USMC terminated the CLAWS program as part of spending cuts.  

In February 2004, the US Army Aviation and Missile Command awarded Raytheon a contract to develop SL-AMRAAM. In 2007-2008, Raytheon successfully tested launching AMRAAM missiles from a six-missile launch rails on a M1097 Humvee. They also added the capability to fire AIM-9X Sidewinder from the launcher. The missiles receive their initial guidance information from a radar not mounted on the vehicle. 

In 2008, the United Arab Emirates (UAE) has requested the purchasing of SL-AMRAAM as part of a larger 7 billion dollar foreign military sales package; the sale would include 288 AMRAAM C-7 missiles.

In 2009 the US Army test fired the SL-AMRAAM from a HIMARS artillery rocket launcher as a common launcher, as part of a move to switch to a larger and more survivable launch platform.

Since the missile is launched without the benefit of an aircraft's speed or high altitude, its range is considerably shorter. Although the engagement range for AMRAAM is estimated to be 75 km for AIM-120B and over 105 km for AIM-120C-5, these ranges are provided for head-on encounters by fast moving aircraft at an altitude, and the range is significantly shorter when the same missiles are launched from stationary ground platforms. Further dimensioning for a stationary ground-launched-missile system is its maximum altitude reach, which by rule of thumb is one third of its maximum horizontal range.

Cancellation
On January 6, 2011, Secretary of Defense Robert Gates announced that the U.S. Army has decided to terminate acquisition of the SLAMRAAM as part of a budget-cutting effort.

The National Guard Association of the United States has sent a letter asking for the United States Senate to stop the Army's plan to drop the SLAMRAAM program because without it there would be no path to modernize the Guard's AN/TWQ-1 Avenger Battalions.

High Mobility Launcher
A more recent version of the SLAMRAAM program is the NASAMS High Mobility Launcher made in cooperation with Kongsberg, where the launch-vehicle is a Humvee (M1152A1 HMMWV), containing four AMRAAMs and two AIM-9X Sidewinder Block II each. First HML launchers were delivered to the Norwegian Army in 2018.

References

External links 

 kongsberg.com - NASAMS - Surface Launched AMRAAM
 army-technology.com - Surface-Launched AMRAAM (SL-AMRAAM / CLAWS), United States of America

Surface-to-air missiles of the United States
Raytheon Company products
Military equipment introduced in the 1990s